The no-hiding theorem states that if information is lost from a system via decoherence, then it moves to the subspace of the environment and it cannot remain in the correlation between the system and the environment. This is a fundamental consequence of the linearity and unitarity of quantum mechanics. Thus, information is never lost. This has implications in black hole information paradox and in fact any process that tends to lose information completely. The no-hiding theorem is robust to imperfection in the physical process that seemingly destroys the original information. 

This was proved by Samuel  L. Braunstein and  Arun K. Pati in 2007. In 2011, the no-hiding theorem was experimentally tested using nuclear magnetic resonance devices where a single qubit undergoes complete randomization; i.e., a pure state transforms to a random mixed state. Subsequently, the lost information has been recovered from the ancilla qubits using suitable local unitary transformation only in the environment Hilbert space in accordance with the no-hiding theorem. This experiment for the first time demonstrated the conservation of quantum information.

Formal statement 
If  is independent of the input state , then in the enlarged Hilbert space the mapping is of the form

where   is the initial state of the environment, 's are the orthonormal basis of the environment Hilbert space and  denotes the fact that one may augment the unused dimension of the environment Hilbert space by zero vectors.

The proof of the no-hiding theorem is based on the linearity and the unitarity of quantum mechanics. The original information which is missing from the final state simply remains in the subspace of the environmental Hilbert space. Also, note that the original information is not in the correlation between the system and the environment. This is the essence of the no-hiding theorem. One can in principle, recover the lost information from the environment by local unitary transformations acting only on the environment Hilbert space.  The no-hiding theorem provides new insights to the nature of quantum information. For example, if classical information is lost from one system it may either move to another system or can be hidden in the correlation between a pair of bit strings. However, quantum information cannot be completely hidden in correlations between a pair of subsystems.  Quantum mechanics allows only one way to completely hide an arbitrary quantum state from one of its subsystems. If it is lost from one subsystem, then it moves to other subsystems.

Conservation of quantum information
Physics relies on conservation laws, which govern how energy and information can change within a system. The conservation of energy states that the total amount of energy in a closed system (like the universe) must stay constant. In classical physics, information can be copied and deleted, but in quantum mechanics, the conservation of quantum information means that information cannot be created or destroyed. This is demonstrated by the no-cloning and no-deleting theorems. The no-hiding theorem further shows that the wave function, which contains all relevant information about a physical system, is conserved as it moves from one Hilbert space to another during unitary time evolution. The conservation of entropy in quantum systems also suggests that information is conserved, as quantum states and mixed states (a combination of quantum states) remain unchanged during unitary evolution.

References

Theorems in quantum mechanics
Quantum information theory
No-go theorems